Marquis Wen of Jin (805–746 BC), ancestral name Ji (姬), given name Chou (仇), was the eleventh ruler of the state of Jin. He was also the first ruler of Jin in the Spring and Autumn period.

In 805 BC, Marquis Mu of Jin was battling with a tribe called Tiao (條). During this time, his eldest son, Chou, was born. In 776 BC, Marquis Mu of Jin died and Chou's uncle, Shang Shu, took control and ascended the throne of Jin. Chou left Jin for fear of his uncle since he believed himself the rightful heir to the throne.

In 781 BC, after four years away from Jin, he brought troops to remove his uncle from the throne. He succeeded and became the next ruler of Jin.

In 771 BC, the tenth year of his reign, King You of Zhou was killed by Quanrong nomads and two Zhou family members were subsequently and separately declared king: King Ping of Zhou and King Xie of Zhou. Therefore, both kings were claiming to be the next king of Zhou.

In 760 BC, the 21st year of his reign, Marquis Wen of Jin killed King Xie of Zhou, and the Zhou government became one again. Since this action helped King Ping of Zhou in establishing the Eastern Zhou Dynasty, Marquis Wen of Jin was heavily rewarded. The King also granted him lands to add to his territory. Also, with the permission of the King, he expanded the territory of Jin, especially areas around the Jin River.

In 746 BC, the 35th year of his reign, he died and his son, Bo, ascended the throne as the next ruler of Jin: Marquis Zhao of Jin.

Monarchs of Jin (Chinese state)
8th-century BC Chinese monarchs
805 BC births
746 BC deaths